Devils Head is a summit in Alberta, Canada.

Devils Head's name is an accurate preservation of its native Cree-language name, we-ti-kwos-ti-kwan.

References

Two-thousanders of Alberta
Alberta's Rockies